Club América de Chimaltenango, is a Guatemalan football club based in Chimaltenango, Chimaltenango Department. They play their home games in the Estadio Municipal de Chimaltenango.

History
Nicknamed Los Cisnes (the Swans), the club has its roots in the club Rey América, who have been regional champions numerous times. They only made their debut in the national league in 2007, in the Tercera Division, and after two successive promotions started the 2009/2010 in the Primera División de Ascenso.

After finishing 9th in the 2009/2010 season in the second tier of Guatemalan football, they were relegated to the Segunda División, Group "E".

Current squad

List of coaches
  Gabriel Castillo y Castillo (2009–10)

References

Football clubs in Guatemala